Tudor domain-containing protein 7 is a protein that in humans is encoded by the TDRD7 gene.

In melanocytic cells TDRD7 gene expression may be regulated by MITF.

Gene polymorphism 

Various single nucleotide polymorphisms (SNPs) of the TDRD7 gene have been identified and for some of them an association with lower susceptibility to age-related cataract was shown.

Interactions 

TDRD7 has been shown to interact with TACC1.

References

Further reading

External links